Terence Arbuthnot•Arnold (5 April 1901 - 5 July 1986) was a British bobsledder who competed during the early 1920s. He won a silver medal in the four-man event at the 1924 Winter Olympics in Chamonix.

References

Bobsleigh four-man Olympic medalists for 1924, 1932-56, and since 1964
DatabaseOlympics.com Thomas Arnold's profile at databaseOlympics.com
Wallenchinsky, David. (1984). "Bobsled: Four-Man". In The Complete Book the Olympics: 1896-1980. New York: Penguin Books. p. 559.
Thomas Arnold's profile at Sports Reference.com

1901 births
Olympic bobsledders of Great Britain
Bobsledders at the 1924 Winter Olympics
British male bobsledders
1986 deaths
Olympic medalists in bobsleigh
Medalists at the 1924 Winter Olympics
Olympic silver medallists for Great Britain